Nemoptera bipennis is a species of slow flying insect in the spoonwing family, Nemopteridae. It is found in Spain, Portugal, and France. Nemoptera bipennis lives in calcareous areas with low vegetation.

The adults are diurnal, and the larvae feed on ant larvae.

References

External links
 
 
 Mediateca - Nemoptera bipennis

Neuroptera
Neuroptera of Europe
Insects described in 1812